Phantom Singer is JTBC's music television program which is an audition program aiming to pick a male crossover vocal quartet. The show's season 1 was aired from November 11, 2016, to  January 27, 2017, every Friday at 21:00. Season 2 was aired from August 11, 2017, to November 11, 2017, every Friday at 21:00. Season 3 was aired from April 10, 2020, to July 3, 2020, every Friday at 21:00. A special season Phantom Singer All Stars was aired from January 26, 2021, to April 20, 2021.

Host 
 Jun Hyun-moo (Seasons 1–3, All Star special)
 Kim Hee-chul (Season 1)

Producers

Format

Seasons 1 to 3 
Contestants who successfully passed the open audition perform a chosen solo song in front of the panel of six producers and further trimmed down to 32 (or 36 in season 3). They proceed to the "1 v 1 duet" stage where contestants are paired up through a random draw and must sing a duet together while competing for a place in the next stage. The producers individually cast their votes on which contestant to keep in each pair. In each duet, the contestant with the lowest number of collective votes are considered for elimination. The producers have a meeting to decide which of the candidates should be kept in the competition and which ones should be eliminated, only announcing the eliminated candidates later; this practice would be repeated for each round of eliminations.

The remaining contestants proceed to the "duet v duet" stage. They are individually allowed to choose their duet partner and are allowed to mix together in a room for thirty minutes before deciding on their duet partner. Each duet will compete against another duet, chosen through a random draw. The panel of producers will individually score each duet out of 100, with 600 being the highest possible score. The panel decides on the candidates for elimination among the losing duets. After that, in preparation for the trio stage, the winning duets will be allowed to pick their third member among those retained contestants who had been in the losing duets. The "trio v trio" stage is conducted in the same way as the "duet v duet" stage and the top 3 winning trios will be allowed the first pick of their fourth member in preparation for the quartet stage. The trios who rank below the top 3 have to reshuffle their line-ups to form new quartets.

The first round of the quartet stage features the quartets performing their selected song and scored by the panel in the same way as the "duet v duet" and "trio v trio" stages. Only the quartet ranked first is allowed to keep all their members while one member from each of the other quartets is eliminated. The remaining contestants are then randomly grouped into quartets for the next round. Similar to the previous round, only the top ranked quartet keeps all their members while the other quartets lose a member each. The remaining twelve contestants write down the contestants they wished to be in a quartet with and undergo an interview with the panel to make their case. The panel makes the final decision based on the vocal range of each contestant and the members' ability to work together as a team.

During the first round of the final stage, the three finalist quartets perform two songs in front of the panel and a live studio audience, accompanied by a live band and chamber orchestra. Points are awarded based on votes from both the audience and the panel of producers. The very last round of the final stage features a much larger studio audience and is televised live. The quartets perform two songs each. The panel does not evaluate the quartets, who are instead awarded points based on text voting and votes from the live studio audience. The winner is decided based on the cumulative points from both rounds.

The scoring method for the "1 v 1" stage was changed in the third season. In that stage, individual producers score each contestant out of 100, with the highest score being 600. Previously, the individual producers only voted for which contestant to keep and the contestant with the least number of votes was immediately a candidate for elimination.

Contestants 
In seasons 1 and 2, 32 contestants were selected from the open auditions. Due to the popularity of the first two seasons, places for four more contestants were added in season 3. The majority of the contestants were professional singers or musical actors with work experience while the remaining contestants came from a variety of backgrounds and included university students (mostly voice majors) and corporate employees who were amateur singers. The contestants themselves were responsible for selecting their repertoire and producing their own performances in collaboration with music director Kwon Tae-eun, renowned for his work on JTBC audition program Superband and with K-pop songwriters and producers J. Y. Park and Bang Si-hyuk.

Winning contestants of Season 1

Winning contestants of Season 2

Winning contestants of Season 3

Phantom Singer All Star 
A twelve-episode All Star special was aired from January to April 2021. It featured the top three quartets from all three seasons. Yoon Sang and Bada, both of whom had been part of the panel of producers, returned and were joined by a "celebrity fan" panel composed of idol singers, actors and comedians. Due to COVID-19 restrictions, there was no audience in the studio; instead the "live audience" joined via live stream and the feed was projected on the screen behind to simulate the presence of a studio audience.

As this special was not a competition, there was no "knock out" format or elimination. Instead, the quartets compete against one another for the trophy and a special prize (mostly foodstuff or coupons). They were assigned seven missions to complete and the winner was named "MVP" and got to keep the trophy on their table for the entire next round until relinquishing it to the next winner. The first mission required quartet members themselves to vote for quartets other than their own while the rest counted votes only from the celebrity panel and the live audience. In the final episode, entitled "Phantom Singer Friends", all nine quartets are reshuffled based on similar song preferences and specially-formed quartets performed the selected song together in their own style.
 

Prior to filming, the quartets draw lots to determine the performance order. The nine celebrity panelists will vote and the quartet will be crowned "All Stars" if they receive a star (vote) from each panelist. The final ranking is determined by combining the votes of the celebrity panel, live audience and the other quartets not performing. The winning team is in bold.	

Each quartet nominates another quartet to go up against. One quartet picks a duel to join, making it a three-way battle. The winning team is in bold and the team with the most votes is named overall MVP.	

Each quartet selects a member to represent their team and perform solo. The singer who earns the most number of points (calculated from live audience and celebrity votes) wins and earns the right to sit on the throne. If another singer earns more points, the previous winner will be immediately "dethroned". The singer who remains on the throne until the end is the overall MVP.

The seasons face off against one another. The quartets from each season reshuffle into two quartets and two duos and face against the quartets and duos from other seasons. The winning team for each match-up is in bold. The season with the most number of wins is the overall MVP.
 

Each team is assigned a genre and must perform a song from that particular genre. They draw lots for the team to compete against and one pair is joined by a third team to form a three-way battle. The overall MVP is decided among the winning teams based on the most number of collective votes from the live audience and celebrity panel.
 

The focus is on Korean-language pop songs and the quartets must choose songs from either the 1980s to 1990s or 2000s and later. The quartet which earns the most number of points (calculated from live audience and celebrity panelists' votes) wins and earns the right to sit on the thrones. If another quartet earns more points, the previous winner will be immediately "dethroned". The quartet who remains on the throne until the end is the overall MVP. The performance order is determined beforehand through a random draw.
 

The quartets have a final showdown and put on their last performances. The winning team is in bold and is decided by votes from the live audience and celebrity panel.

Before filming, the top nine most viewed and trended songs from Phantom Singer (three from each season) are chosen. Each of the 36 participants select the three songs they want to perform and the production team groups them according to their choices and vocal range. There is no winner selected.

List of episodes and rating 
In the ratings below, the highest rating for the show will be in red, and the lowest rating for the show will be in blue each season.

Season 1

Season 2

Season 3

Phantom Singer All Star special

Awards and nominations

Reception
The show has been credited with reintroducing the classical crossover genre to the South Korean public and popularizing it. It also increased interest and awareness of the bel canto style of singing more commonly used in classical repertoire, especially opera. The unique format of the show, where both amateur singers of different backgrounds and trained singers were randomly grouped together and given the artistic freedom to arrange and design their own performances, ensured that the performances showcased songs from a variety of genres, rather than only traditional classical crossover. Some of the contestants' performances on the show, especially in the All Star special, have been described by several media outlets as "genre-destroying".

The JoongAng Ilbo, noted in an op-ed on the ratings success of the first season, positive reception from viewers and the high quality of the performances: "It was also the moment when unknown musicians who had excellent skills but did not have a stage to sing to their heart's content were reborn as stars." The Korea Herald praised its focus on the contestants' musical skills and professional training and their preparation process prior to each performance rather than overly relying on the "entertainment factor" and "personal storylines" characteristic of most K-pop or idol-focused domestic audition or survival programs. Viewers have praised the choice of "producers" (the six-member panel) as they were selected based on industry experience and expertise, rather appearing merely to boost viewership.

Impact and legacy
Commentators and industry observers noted that Phantom Singer was met with negativity from traditionalist factions of the classical music community but was enthusiastically embraced by the younger generation of classically-trained singers. The enthusiasm arose from a dissatisfaction with the unspoken restrictions on what repertoire they were supposed to perform as "classical musicians" and they saw Phantom Singer as a platform to collaborate with fellow musicians and utilize their skillset without limitations. The show gained notoriety within the domestic classical music community due to the large number of classically-trained singers and voice majors participating as contestants and the presence of opera singer Son Hye-soo in the panel of producers. Of the final twelve contestants from each season, more than half were classically-trained. Seasons 2 and 3 notably featured contestants who had been winners or finalists at prestigious vocal music competitions abroad, held postgraduate degrees in voice or were already establishing themselves at various opera houses in Europe. 

Despite the global success of The Three Tenors and Il Divo, the domestic classical music community was still largely conservative and segregationist and frowned on voice majors performing popular music due to a prevailing prejudice that classically-trained singers who ventured into popular music would lose their singing skills. Such attitudes persisted into the 2000's, with tenor Park In-soo being infamously expelled from his opera company after collaborating with folk singer Lee Dong-won for the 1989 hit "Nostalgia" (향수) while musical theater veteran and crossover singer Kai, a voice major from Seoul National University and the first crossover recording artist to top the domestic classical chart and chart in the top 30 of the Gaon Album Chart, faced considerable opposition from most of his professors when he shunned a career in opera. The classically-trained members of the winning teams from all three seasons have openly stated that the restrictive environment was what prompted them to audition for Phantom Singer rather than pursue a career solely in opera and classical music and welcomed the program as a much-needed platform to boost the profile of the crossover genre.

While crossover vocal groups have existed prior to Phantom Singer, the quartets formed on the show continue to enjoy much more mainstream popularity and regularly appear on weekly televised music programs such as Open Concert and Immortal Songs: Singing the Legend. According to statistics compiled by the Korea Performing Arts Box Office Information System (KOPIS), concerts by Phantom Singer participants dominated ticket sales within the "classical and opera" category for the first half of 2021, despite COVID-19 restrictions. The decrease in ticket sales of other classical musicians and groups, in contrast to those who appeared on Phantom Singer, have prompted observations that the domestic classical music industry has failed to adapt marketing and presentation strategies to attract a new generation of concert-goers or overcome the perception about classical music being "boring".

References

External links
 Phantom Singer 1
 Phantom Singer 2
 Phantom Singer 3
 Phantom Singer All Star

2016 South Korean television series debuts
JTBC original programming
Korean-language television shows
Music competitions in South Korea
Singing talent shows